The 2021 FIBA Women's Asia Cup Division A was the 29th edition of the tournament, held from 27 September to 3 October 2021 in Amman, Jordan. The tournament was originally set to be hosted by India. It served as the Asian and Oceanian qualification for the 2022 FIBA Women's Basketball World Cup in Australia, where the top four teams qualified for one of the qualifying tournaments.

Japan won their sixth title after beating China in the final. Australia captured the bronze medal by defeating South Korea.

The Division B tournament will be held also in the same venue from 7 to 13 November, with 6 teams participating, including the host country.

Venue

Qualified teams
The same eight teams from the last edition qualified for this years' tournament, listed by their final position. Since no Division B tournament was held in the 2019 edition, the last finishing team was not relegated to this edition's Division B tournament.

For Division A:
Semifinalists at the 2019 FIBA Women's Asia Cup:

 5th-8th Placers of the 2019 FIBA Women's Asia Cup:

For Division B:
The host nation

Early registrants for the Division B slots from FIBA Asia:

Squads

Division A

Preliminary round
All times are local (UTC+03:00).

Group A

Group B

Knockout round

Bracket

Playoffs

Semifinals
As Australia, host of the 2022 FIBA Women's Basketball World Cup, made it to the semifinals, all four teams qualify to the 2022 FIBA Women's Basketball World Cup Qualifying Tournament.

Seventh place game
This was also a relegation playoff, with the winner retaining Division A status, while the loser relegated to Division B.

Fifth place game

Third place game

Final

Division B
All times are local (UTC+02:00)

Preliminary round

Group A

Group B

Knockout round

Bracket

Playoffs

Fifth place game

Semifinals

Third place game

Final
This is also a promotion playoff, with the loser retaining Division B status, while the winner promoted to Division A.

Final standings

Division A

Division B

Statistics and awards

Statistical leaders

Players

Points

Rebounds

Assists

Blocks

Steals

Efficiency

Teams

Points

Rebounds

Assists

Blocks

Steals

Efficiency

Awards
The awards were announced on 3 October 2021.

See also
 2021 FIBA Asia Cup
 2022 FIBA Women's Basketball World Cup

References

External links
Official website
Tournament summary (Division A)

 
2021
September 2021 sports events in Asia
October 2021 sports events in Asia
Women
2021 in women's basketball
International basketball competitions hosted by Jordan
Women